is a Japanese actress from Ibaraki Prefecture, Japan.

Filmography

Film
 Shiroi Fune (2002)
 Swing Girls (2004) as Yayoi Itami
 Densha Otoko (2005) cameo
 The Harimaya Bridge (2009) as Kayo Takeuchi
 Halfway (2009)
 The Master of Funerals (2019)

TV dramas
 Bijo ka Yajuu (2003 Fuji TV)
 Tokyo Love Cinema (2003 Fuji TV)
 Anata no tonari ni dare ga iru (2003 Fuji TV)
 Orange Days (2004 TBS) as Akane Ozawa
 Hotman 2 (2004 TBS)
 Minna Mukashi wa Kodomo Datta (2005 KTV)
 Densha Otoko (2005 Fuji TV) as Misuzu Jinkama
 Sengoku Jieitai (2006 NTV)
 Suppli (2006 Fuji TV)
 Densha Otoko DX: Saigo no Seizen (2006 Fuji TV)
 Nodame Cantabile (2006 Fuji TV) as Kaori Eto (Kozo Eto's wife)
 Dondo Hare (2007 NHK)
 Hanayome to Papa (2007 Fuji TV)
 Kiri no Hi (2008 NHK)
 General Rouge no Gaisen (2010 Fuji TV)
 Hiyokko (2017 NHK) as Kuniko Takeuchi

Anime
 Fullmetal Alchemist (Psiren)

External links
Official site 

1978 births
Living people
Japanese actresses
Actors from Ibaraki Prefecture